"Got the Life" is a song written and recorded by American band Korn for their third studio album, Follow the Leader which was released as the album's second single on November 23, 1998. It was recorded in April 1998 at NRG Recording Studios. The band decided they would release the song as a promotional single after each member found that there was something "special" about the song. The single had "phenomenal success", and its music video was requested more than any other video on MTV's TRL, making it the first officially "retired" music video.

"Got the Life" did not receive much attention in the music press; however, the song was rewarded a gold certification in Australia by the Australian Recording Industry Association. It peaked at number one on the Canadian RPM Rock/Alternative Chart chart, as well as number fifteen on the US Billboard Mainstream Rock Tracks chart and number seventeen on the US Billboard Modern Rock Tracks chart.

Background and release
"Got the Life" was recorded in April 1998 at NRG Recording Studios in North Hollywood, California. After recording the song, the group's members each felt that there was something "special" about the song. Lead vocalist Jonathan Davis claimed that it reminded him of "something you might hear at raves", which were very popular at the time. Even though they thought that many fans would not appreciate the song, they released it as a promotional single in early August 1998, before the release of Follow the Leader. "Got the Life" was said by Leah Furman to be "revolved around the mixed blessings of fame."

The single was sent to radio stations on July 24, 1998, and has been released five times. The single's first release was on August 10, 1998, where it was released with two versions in the United States. The single contains different mixes of the song, including "Deejay Punk-Roc Remix" and the instrumental "D.O.S.E.'s Woollyback Remix." The single also apprehends B-sides and remixes to earlier songs. Stephen Thomas Erlewine reviewed the single, giving it two out of five stars, and noting that "the 'Deejay Punk-Roc Remix' is pretty good, but the instrumental is of negligible worth. The second part of the single is backed with 'I Can Remember' plus 'Good God (OOMPH! vs. Such A Surge Remix)'. The single was also released in Australia, and in the United Kingdom twice. The single was considered to have had "phenomenal success".

Composition

"Got the Life" is three minutes and forty-five seconds long. It is the shortest song on Follow the Leader, and like the album the single was produced by Steve Thompson and Toby Wright, and was mixed by Brendan O'Brien. "Got the Life (Deejay Punk-Roc remix)" was mixed by Deejay Punk-Roc and Jon Paul Davies, and was recorded at Airdog Funk Research Department and Liverpool, England. The D.O.S.E.'s Woollyback remix was mixed by D.O.S.E. in courtesy of Mercury Records.

The song starts off with a single percussion beat, leading into the refrain riff, with a triple guitar overdub. When the verses emerge, lead singer Jonathan Davis begins singing with the lyrical line "Hate, something, sometime, someway, something kicked on the front floor." Korn performed the song with the following members: Jonathan Davis performing vocals, Brian "Head" Welch and James "Munky" Shaffer performing guitars, Reginald "Fieldy" Arvizu, performing on the bass guitar, and David Silveria on the drum kit. They produced a sound described by employees of Allmusic as having a style of alternative metal, heavy metal, and rap–metal genres.

In a 2013 interview with Scuzz, Jonathan Davis revealed that "Got the Life" originally contained an audio sample at the very beginning - a piece of dialogue spoken by actor Dom DeLuise in the 1974 film Blazing Saddles. Warner Brothers would not allow its usage, however, so it was removed prior to the song's release.

Music video

Korn decided to shoot a music video for "Got the Life" after the reception from fans and employees at NRG Recording Studios was very positive. The music video's concept was by the band's bassist Reginald "Fieldy" Arvizu. Their managers advised them to request Joseph Kahn to direct the video. Kahn also was the director for "A.D.I.D.A.S." music video in 1997. After asking Kahn to direct their video, he responded saying "That's the stupidest idea I've ever heard."

Offended by and against his response, Korn hired McG, director of the band's music videos from their self-titled debut album — "Blind", "Shoots and Ladders", "Clown", and "Faget". On January 12, 1999, music video was the first video that is considered to be "retired" from MTV's daily top ten countdown, Total Request Live. MTV's Total Request Live said the song was the most requested music video "for too long so they had to stop airing it so other artists would have a chance at the coveted number one spot." The video, however, never actually reached number one; it peaked at number two. (In fact, for the majority of its run, it was stuck at third behind videos by N'Sync and Britney Spears; at the time, Daly jokingly called the #3 position on the countdown "The Korn Spot".)  Deuce, the video album where "Got the Life"'s music video appears on, was certified Platinum by the Recording Industry Association of America. California rapper WC makes a cameo appearance in the video dancing. Eminem, Jay Gordon of Orgy, Fred Durst, Sam Rivers, Wes Borland of Limp Bizkit, and UFC fighter Tito Ortiz can be seen in the end of the video.

Reception

AllMusic's Stephen Thomas Erlewine gave the single 2/5 stars, although he stated that the song "rivaled such previous masterworks as 'A.D.I.D.A.S.' and 'Shoots and Ladders'. Their fusion of metal and rap was stronger than ever, boasting their best rhythm tracks to date. Which is good, since the B-sides of the 'Got the Life' singles were devoted to remixes."

"Got the Life" is widely considered to be one of Korn's best songs. In 2019, Loudwire ranked the song number ten on their list of the 50 greatest Korn songs, and in 2021, Kerrang ranked the song number seven on their list of the 20 greatest Korn songs.

"Got the Life" became Korn's first entry on Billboards Mainstream Rock Songs and Alternative Songs charts, peaking at number fifteen and number seventeen, respectively. The song peaked at number twenty-six in Australia, and shipments of a CD single have surpassed 35,000 units. "Got the Life"'s music video debuted at number eight on MTV's Total Request Live, on September 17, 1998.

Track listing

US single

Single remixes

Australian single

UK single #1

UK single #2

Charts

See also
List of RPM Rock/Alternative number-one singles (Canada)

References
Literature

Cited

Korn songs
1998 singles
1998 songs
Music videos directed by McG
Songs written by Reginald Arvizu
Songs written by Jonathan Davis
Songs written by James Shaffer
Songs written by David Silveria
Songs written by Brian Welch